Ignazio Francesco Giunti (30 August 1941 – 10 January 1971) was an Italian racing driver. He competed in Formula One as well as in saloon and Sports Car Racing.

Giunti was born in Rome. In 1968, driving for Alfa Romeo, he finished second in the Targa Florio and fourth in the Le Mans 24 Hours race co-driving with Nanni Galli.

In 1970, Giunti was signed by Ferrari primarily for their sports-car team, and won the 12 Hours of Sebring as well as achieving several other high placings. His success earned him a Formula One chance along with Clay Regazzoni, who Ferrari was also trialling at the time. Giunti finished fourth on his debut in the Belgian GP at Spa. Despite his being out-performed by Regazzoni during the remaining races, he was re-signed by Ferrari for the following season.

Giunti was killed during his first drive in 1971 whilst racing in the 1000 km Buenos Aires. He was leading the race when his Ferrari 312PB prototype ploughed into the back of the Matra-Simca MS660 of Jean-Pierre Beltoise, who was pushing the car along the track after it had run out of fuel. He died due to the impact and the subsequent fire.

Complete Formula One results
(key)

References

Sources
 Formula One World Championship results are derived from 
 

1941 births
1971 deaths
Racing drivers from Rome
Italian racing drivers
Italian Formula One drivers
Ferrari Formula One drivers
Racing drivers who died while racing
Sport deaths in Argentina
24 Hours of Le Mans drivers
Filmed deaths in motorsport
World Sportscar Championship drivers
24 Hours of Daytona drivers
12 Hours of Sebring drivers
People of Calabrian descent